Munster is a quiet coastal town in Ugu District Municipality in the KwaZulu-Natal province of South Africa.

Facilities
Other facilities in Munster include a small airfield that lies east of the R61, many guest houses in the area, a service station and pharmacy.

Tourism
Munster Beach enjoys a backdrop of picturesque coastal vegetation, which is home to birds and bugs, adding to the biodiversity.

The mouth of the Itongasi River has made it a perfect place for launching boats, and Glenmore Beach is often the site of beauty and fishing competitions. The annual Sardine Run, which beached in Glenmore Bay in 2000 and 2001, attracts such large schools of dolphin that need to be seen to be believed.

Confusion with Glenmore Beach
Munster is within walking distance of adjacent Glenmore Beach and it can get a little confusing, particularly as the swimming and surfing bay in Munster is known as Glenmore beach.

Recreation

Munster Sports Club is a sports complex in Munster which offer bowls, tennis and squash facilities. Munster is also home to the Glenmore Ski-Boat Club.

Transport

R61 road
The R61 regional route lies west of Munster and connects to most towns of the Lower South Coast such as Port Edward, Southbroom, Margate, Shelly Beach and Port Shepstone. The road also goes further than KwaZulu-Natal in the south to Mbizana, Mthatha and ending in Beaufort West in the Western Cape province.

Air
Munster Airfield is a private airfield used only by the farm owner. It is kept in good order and there is a geocache next to it.

References

Populated places in the Ray Nkonyeni Local Municipality
Populated coastal places in South Africa
KwaZulu-Natal South Coast